Boafo is a surname. Notable people with the surname include:

Amoako Boafo (born 1984), Ghanaian painter and visual artist
John Boafo, Ghanaian rower 
Kwabena Boafo (born 1977), Ghanaian footballer
Nicholas Yaw Boafo Adade (1927–2013), Ghanaian judge
Paul Boafo, Ghanaian theologian and minister